The fourth season of Friends, an American sitcom created by David Crane and Marta Kauffman, premiered on NBC on September 25, 1997. Friends was produced by Bright/Kauffman/Crane Productions, in association with Warner Bros. Television. The season contains 24 episodes and concluded airing May 7, 1998.

Reception
It was one of three seasons included on TV Guides list of the Top 100 TV Seasons.

Collider ranked it #8 on their list of the ten Friends seasons, and cited "The One with the Embryos" as its best episode.

Cast and characters

(In particular, Introduced in season 4 or Only in season 4)

Main cast
 Jennifer Aniston as Rachel Green
 Courteney Cox as Monica Geller
 Lisa Kudrow as Phoebe Buffay
 Matt LeBlanc as Joey Tribbiani
 Matthew Perry as Chandler Bing
 David Schwimmer as Ross Geller

Recurring cast
 

 
 Helen Baxendale as Emily Waltham
 Tate Donovan as Joshua Burgin
 Giovanni Ribisi as Frank Buffay, Jr.
 Debra Jo Rupp as Alice Knight
 Alison LaPlaca as Joanna
 Michael G. Hagerty as Mr. Treeger
 James Michael Tyler as Gunther
 Teri Garr as Phoebe Abbott
 Laura Dean as Sophie
 Paget Brewster as Kathy

Guest stars
 Maggie Wheeler as Janice Litman
 Elliott Gould as Jack Geller
 Christina Pickles as Judy Geller
 Jane Sibbett as Carol Willick
 Jessica Hecht as Susan Bunch
 Penn Jillette as Encyclopedia Salesman
 Jason Brooks as Rick
 Michael Vartan as Tim Burke
 Dan Gauthier as Chip Matthews
 Rebecca Romijn as Cheryl
 Taylor Negron as Alessandro
 Sherri Shepherd as Rhonda, the tour guide
 Tom Conti as Steven Waltham
 Jennifer Saunders as Andrea Waltham
 June Whitfield as the housekeeper
 Olivia Williams as Felicity
 Jane Carr as the ticket agent
 Sarah Ferguson as Herself
 Charlton Heston as himself
 Christina Moore as Marjorie
 Hugh Laurie - as The Gentleman on the Plane

Episodes

Notes

References

External links
 

04
1997 American television seasons
1998 American television seasons